Olivier-David Benoît (6 February 1837 – 19 February 1897) was a shoemaker by trade and attained importance in history as a trade union leader.

Benoît had his early trade union experience with an American-based group called the Knights of Labor. Expanding from the United States to Canada in the late 19th century, they supported a radical set of social reforms. They were politically active and worked to educate the public with their positions

Olivier-David Benoît was a first generation labour leader who believed in the ideals espoused by the Knights and worked to give working people a societal voice. In a notable case, Benoît appeared before the Royal Commission on the Relations of Capital and Labor in Canada chaired by James Sherrard Armstrong. In that appearance he was to make his case about the conditions faced by workers in the boot and shoe industry.

References 
 Jacques Rouillard, “BENOÎT, OLIVIER-DAVID,” in Dictionary of Canadian Biography, vol. 12, University of Toronto/Université Laval, 2003–, accessed March 12, 2021, http://www.biographi.ca/en/bio/benoit_olivier_david_12E.html.

1837 births
1897 deaths
Trade unionists from Quebec
Shoemakers
Knights of Labor people